Abdumalik Khalokov (uzb: Xaloqov Abdumalik Anvar o'g'li, born 9 April 2000) is an Uzbekistani amateur boxer, who won a gold medal at the Youth World Championships and 2018 Summer Youth Olympics.

Amateur career 

He won gold medal at the 2018 Summer Youth Olympics in bantamweight -56kg and at the AIBA Youth World Boxing Championships 2018 in -56kg weight category. At the 2018 Youth World Championships he fought against Russian Vsevolod Shumkov and won gold medal in Bantamweight. In 2021 Khalokov took part at the AIBA World Boxing Championships 2021 in Belgrade, Serbia and won silver medal of tournier in Lightweight (60kg) division.

2021 AIBA World Boxing Championships results

Round of 32: Defeated Jasin Ljama (North Macedonia) 5-0

Round of 16: Defeated Tadej Černoga (Slovenia) 5-0

Quarter-finals: Defeated Vsevolod Shumkov (Russia) 5-0

Semi-finals: Oponnent forfeited due to injury Danial Shahbakhsh (Iran)

Finals: Defeated by Sofiane Oumiha (France) 5-0

References

External links 
 
 Abdumalik Khalokov Official Instagram page
Abdumalik Khalokov Facebook  page

2000 births
Uzbekistani male boxers
AIBA World Boxing Championships medalists
Boxers at the 2018 Summer Youth Olympics
Medalists at the 2018 Summer Youth Olympics
Living people
Youth and Junior World Boxing Championships medalists